Patricia L. Garfield was an American academic specializing in the study of dreams, specifically the cognitive processes underpinning them. She was the author of 10 books covering a broad range of dream topics. These topics include: nightmares, children’s dreams, healing through dreams and dream-related art. Her best-known work is “Creative Dreaming.” Originally published in 1974 it was revised and reprinted again in 1995. She holds a Ph.D in psychology from Temple University.

Garfield was one of the six co-founders of the International Association for the Study of Dreams (IASD), originally called the Association for the Study of Dreams (ASD). The IASD is a non-profit, international, multidisciplinary organization dedicated to the “pure and applied investigation of dreams and dreaming.” Garfield was the President of the ASD from 1998 to 1999. She died on November 22, 2021 at the age of 87.

Works 
 
 Mourning Dove: Dream Poems, Numina Books, 2007.
 
  – Non-fiction winner of the 2002 Parents' Guide Media Award, nominated for the Young Hoosier's Book Award 2004-2005
 
 
 
 Creative Dreaming: Plan And Control Your Dreams to Develop Creativity, Overcome Fears, Solve Problems, and Create a Better Self, Simon & Schuster, first printed in 1974, reprinted with 19 domestic printings and nine foreign editions in 1976. Revised and reprinted in 1995. – Psychology Today book club alternate selection
 The Healing Power of Dreams, Simon & Schuster, 1991, with two foreign editions.
 Women's Bodies, Women's Dreams, Ballantine Books, 1988.
 
 Your Child's Dreams, Ballantine Books, 1984, three foreign editions.
 Pathway to Ecstasy: The Way of the Dream Mandala, Holt, Rinehart and Winston, 1979, one foreign edition, Prentice Hall, 1989, trade edition.

References

External links
 International Association for the Study of Dreams (IASD) website
 The Center for Creative Dreaming

Year of birth missing (living people)
Place of birth missing (living people)
Living people
American non-fiction writers
American women non-fiction writers
21st-century American women